Geauga County Transit is the transit bus agency serving Geauga County, Ohio.  It operates demand-responsive (door-to-door) transit buses, including out-of-county service.

Greater Cleveland Regional Transit Authority, a neighboring transit agency, provides service near the Cuyahoga-Geauga County border where connections can be made.

References

Bus transportation in Ohio
Transportation in Geauga County, Ohio